Dominion 6.12 in Osaka-jo Hall was a professional wrestling event promoted by New Japan Pro-Wrestling (NJPW). The event took place on June 12, 2022, in Osaka, Osaka, at the Osaka-jō Hall and is the fourteenth event under the Dominion name and eighth in a row to take place at the Osaka-jō Hall.

Ten matches were contested at the event. In the main event, Jay White defeated Kazuchika Okada to win the IWGP World Heavyweight Championship. In other prominent matches, Will Ospreay defeated Sanada to win the vacant IWGP United States Heavyweight Championship, and Hiroshi Tanahashi defeated Hirooki Goto to face Jon Moxley at AEW x NJPW: Forbidden Door for the interim AEW World Championship.

Production

Storylines
Dominion 6.12 in Osaka-jo Hall featured professional wrestling matches that involved different wrestlers from pre-existing scripted feuds and storylines. Wrestlers portrayed villains, heroes, or less distinguishable characters in the scripted events that built tension and culminated in a wrestling match or series of matches.

Results

References

External links
The official New Japan Pro-Wrestling website

2022
June 2022 events in Japan
2022 in professional wrestling
Events in Osaka
Professional wrestling in Osaka